Cumberland College is a residential college in Dunedin, New Zealand for the University of Otago. Cumberland College was established as a hall of residence in 1989. It is located in the former Dunedin Hospital Nurses' Home, built in 1916, across the road from Dunedin Hospital and the Queen Mary Maternity Hospital. Cumberland College is linked by tunnels to both Dunedin Hospital and Hayward College (formerly the maternity hospital). Over 7000 students have spent time living in Cumberland College since its establishment.

Cumberland has a social program that includes floor events, inter-college competitions, regular sports events, ski trips, and the annual ball. Cumberland also provides tutorials in a number of university subjects for its residents, along with floor based Study Groups that have additional tutorial support. Cumberland is one of the few Residential Colleges to allocate bedrooms by course of study as part of its academic program.

The current Warden at Cumberland College is Luke Morrison, alongside Deputy Wardens, Brian Satake & Jenna Lockhart, and Assistant Warden Zoey Taylor.

Construction 
Cumberland College is made up of the main Cumberland College building that houses 328 students. Until 2015 Cumberland College also included Cumberland Courts which was made up of flatting units situated 5 minute's walk away from the College that housed 102 students. The main Cumberland College building was built as the Dunedin Hospital Nurses Home in 1916. The building has been extensively renovated since its purchase by the University of Otago in 1989.

Claimed hauntings 
The college is reputed to be haunted by a spirit known as "the Grey Lady", the apparition possibly dating from the college's time as a nurse's hostel.

Coat of arms

References

External links
 Cumberland College website

Buildings and structures of the University of Otago
University residences in New Zealand
Reportedly haunted locations in Dunedin
1910s architecture in New Zealand